Tilgarsley was a village in Oxfordshire. It was recorded as existing in 1279 and was abandoned before 1350 as a result of the Black Death. It is thought to be sited on what is now Bowles Farm, north west of Eynsham.

References
 Abandoned Communities -  The Black Death

External links
Eynsham: Tilgarsley in A History of the County of Oxford: Volume 12
Black Death: The Effect of the Plague - BBC History

Deserted medieval villages in Oxfordshire